Belle Taylor was a screenwriter who wrote silent short films for Biograph in the United States in the early 1910s.

Selected filmography 

 Her Father's Silent Partner (1914)
 A Welcome Intruder (1913)
 Love's Messenger (1912) 
 Iola's Promise (1912)
 The Old Bookkeeper (1912) 
 His Daughter (1911) 
 A Wreath of Orange Blossoms (1911) 
 A Child's Stratagem (1910)
 The Broken Doll (1910)

References

External links

American women screenwriters
Year of birth missing
Year of death missing
Place of birth missing
Place of death missing
American screenwriters
Silent film screenwriters